Adrian Titieni (born 6 June 1963) is a Romanian actor. He appeared in more than fifty films since 1985.

Selected filmography

References

External links 

1963 births
Living people
Romanian male film actors